Events from the year 1845 in Russia

Incumbents
 Monarch – Nicholas I

Events

Births

 Vera Zavadovskaya, courtier  (b. 1768)
 Alexander III, monarch (d. 1894)

References

1845 in Russia
Years of the 19th century in the Russian Empire